The following is a list of episodes from the 1985–1989 television series Alfred Hitchcock Presents, which was a revival of the original 1955–1962 series of the same name. The new series lasted only one season on NBC. NBC cancelled it, but it was then produced for three more years by USA Network.

Series Overview

Episodes

Pilot film (1985)
A 100-minute made-for-TV film was presented as the pilot for the series; it consisted of four episodes, all remakes of ones from the original series.  This first aired on May 5, 1985 on NBC.

Season 1 (1985–86)

Season 2 (1987)

Season 3 (1988)

Season 4 (1988–89)

See also
 List of Alfred Hitchcock Presents episodes (1955-1965 series)

Lists of American crime drama television series episodes
Lists of American horror-supernatural television series episodes